, since the 1992 inception of the top level Croatian association football league competition, the Prva HNL, 132 players have scored three goals (a hat-trick) or more in a single match. Including players repeating the accomplishment, the feat has been achieved 195 times.

The first player to achieve the feat was Dean Ljubančić, in May 1992, who scored three times for Rijeka in a 3–0 victory over Istra. Eighteen players, on a total of 21 occasions, have scored more than three goals in a match: Marijo Dodik holds the record for most goals in a match, netting six times for Slaven Belupo in a 7–1 victory over Varteks, in October 2000; Goran Vlaović scored more than three goals in three different games (twice in 1993, once in 1995), while Mate Dragičević achieved it in two different games (both in 2002).

In January 1994, both Goran Vlaović and Igor Cvitanović scored hat-tricks for Croatia Zagreb twice in a week, against Dubrovnik in an 8–2 victory and a week later against Osijek in a 7–1 win. In April 2008, Rijeka's Radomir Đalović and Zadar's Želimir Terkeš scored opposing hat-tricks in a match that Rijeka won 5–3; of the 195 total hat-tricks, Terkeš' was the first, and one of only four total, scored by a player on the losing club. The July 2009 fixture between Rijeka and Lokomotiva saw Rijeka's brothers Ahmad and Anas Sharbini both score a hat-trick for the home team.

Eighteen players have score more than one hat-trick, of which four players have each accomplished the feat six different times: Igor Cvitanović, Igor Pamić, Goran Vlaović and Davor Vugrinec. Four players have each scored hat-tricks for at least three clubs: Igor Pamić (Istra, Pazinka, Osijek), Davor Vugrinec (Varteks, Rijeka, Dinamo Zagreb, NK Zagreb), Zoran Zekić (Zadar, Kamen Ingrad, Cibalia) and Ivan Krstanović (NK Zagreb, Rijeka, Zadar).

Hat-tricks

Multiple hat-tricks
The following table lists the number of hat-tricks scored by players who have scored three or more hat-tricks. Bold denotes players still playing in the Prva HNL, italics denotes players still playing professional football.

References

External links

Association football in Croatia lists
Lists of association football team hat-tricks
hat-tricks